Lac des Mille Lacs 22A2 (formerly Seine River 22A2) is a First Nations reserve in northwestern Ontario, Canada. It is one of the reserves of the Lac des Mille Lacs First Nation.

References

Saulteaux reserves in Ontario
Communities in Thunder Bay District